In the Hebrew Bible, Oholah and Oholibah (or Aholah and Aholibah in the King James Version and Young's Literal Translation) are pejorative personifications given by the prophet Ezekiel to the cities of Samaria in the Kingdom of Israel and Jerusalem in the kingdom of Judah, respectively. They appear in chapter 23 of the Book of Ezekiel.

There is a pun in these names in the Hebrew.  means "her tent", and  means "my tent is in her".

The Hebrew prophets frequently compared the sin of idolatry to the sin of adultery, in a reappearing rhetorical figure. Ezekiel's rhetoric directed against these two allegorical figures depicts them as lusting after Egyptian men in explicitly sexual terms in Ezekiel 23:20–21:

Catharism

In the divergent Theology of the Cathars, the heterodox Christian movement thriving in the 12th to 14th Centuries, Oholah and Oholibah inspired the belief that the Cathar Invisible Father had two spiritual wives, Collam and Hoolibam.

See also 
 Ezekiel 16
 Ezekiel 23
 Rape in the Hebrew Bible § Ezekiel 16 and 23

References

Book of Ezekiel
Pejorative demonyms
Hebrew-language names
Hebrew words and phrases in the Hebrew Bible
Sexuality in the Bible
Fictional prostitutes